The Men's slalom competition of the FIS Alpine World Ski Championships 2021 was held on 21 February, with a qualification on 20 February 2021.

Results

Final
The first run was started on 21 February at 10:00, and the second run at 13:30.

Qualification
The first run was started on 20 February at 10:00, and the second run at 13:30.

References

Men's slalom